Carenum obsoletum is a species of ground beetle in the subfamily Scaritinae. It was described by William John Macleay in 1888.

References

obsoletum
Beetles described in 1888